David 'Dai' Wilkins (born 22 July 1942) is a former Welsh international lawn and indoor bowler.

Bowls career
He won two Commonwealth Games bronze medals in the fours at the 1998 Commonwealth Games in Kuala Lumpur and the 2002 Commonwealth Games in Manchester.

He is a seven times Welsh National Bowls Championships winner, winning the singles in 1983 & 1996, the pairs in 1987 with his son Jeff, triples winner in 1986 & 1991 and fours winner in 2012 & 2013.

Football
He had a soccer trial with Cardiff City F.C. before playing rugby for Glynneath RFC.

References

1942 births
Living people
Commonwealth Games bronze medallists for Wales
Bowls players at the 2002 Commonwealth Games
Welsh male bowls players
Commonwealth Games medallists in lawn bowls
Medallists at the 1998 Commonwealth Games
Medallists at the 2002 Commonwealth Games